Hunter Hunted is a documentary on the National Geographic Channel. It is a show similar to CSI but focuses on animal attacks.

Episodes
"Ambushed" (black bears)
"Horns of Death" (African buffaloes)
"Danger in the Delta" (hippos)
"Death Down Under" (dingoes)
"Dolphin Attack" (dolphins)
"Cougars Island" (cougars)
"Gator Attack" (alligators)
"Kidnapped" (baboons)
"Kodiak Attack" (Kodiak bears)
"Mangrove Maneaters" (Bengal tigers)
"Predators in Paradise" (alligators)
"Shadow Stalkers" (Canadian timber wolves)
"Shark Invasion" (sharks)
"Stalked at Sea" (great white sharks)
"Tanzania Terror" (African lions)
"The Silent Stalker" (vampire bats)
"Victims of Venom" (cobras)
"Jungle Breakout" (chimpanzees)
"Bear Man's Land" (brown bears)
"Ghosts of the Snow" (Siberian tigers)
"Outback Attack" (saltwater crocodiles)
"Dragon King" (Komodo dragons)
"Arctic Attack" (polar bears)
"Rhino Showdown" (black and white rhinos)

External links

2000s American documentary television series
Media about animal attacks
National Geographic (American TV channel) original programming
2005 American television series debuts
2008 American television series endings